The School Town of Speedway is a public school district based in Speedway, Indiana (USA). The district has six campuses and an enrollment of approximately 1,650 students.

Schools

High school
Grades 9-12
Speedway Senior High School

Junior high school
Grades 7-8
Speedway Junior High School

Elementary schools
Grades K-6
James A. Allison Elementary School
Carl G. Fisher Elementary School
Arthur C. Newby Elementary School
Frank H. Wheeler Elementary School

Enrollment
2007-08 School Year: 1,654 students (preliminary)
2006-07 School Year: 1,627 students
2005-06 School Year: 1,696 students
2004-05 School Year: 1,654 students
2003-04 School Year: 1,662 students

Demographics
There were a total of 1,627 students enrolled in the School Town of Speedway during the 2006-2007 school year. The gender makeup of the district was 48.06% female and 51.94% male. The racial makeup of the district was 65.03% White, 19.18% African American, 9.71% Hispanic, 4.36% Multiracial, 1.48% Asian, and 0.25% Native American. 40.01% of the district's students receive free or reduced lunch.

See also
List of school districts in Indiana

References

External links
Speedway School District

School districts in Indiana
Education in Marion County, Indiana
Education in Indianapolis